The Taliq Bridge is a cultural heritage monument in Doblibare, Gjakova, Kosovo.

The bridge lies on the southern edge of the Great Čaršija and crosses the Krena River. A wall inscription dates construction to 1816, when it was built by the Tabakëve (Turkish tobacco merchants’ guild) in their eponymous Tabak neighborhood. The carved stone arch bridge includes one large arch and two smaller vaults near the banks. An auxiliary window opens between the vaults.

References

Historic sites in Kosovo
Stone bridges in Kosovo
Bridges completed in 1816